Dr. Herbert Vivian Hordern (10 February 1883 – 17 June 1938), also known as Ranji Hordern, was an Australian cricketer who played in seven Test matches between 1911 and 1912. He was the first major leg-spin and googly bowler to play for Australia. His nickname, "Ranji", came from his dark complexion, and is a reference to the famous Indian England test cricketer K S Ranjitsinhji. Hordern was a member of the Hordern family, well known as retailers in Sydney.

Career
Hordern was born in North Sydney, New South Wales and made his debut in first-class cricket by taking 8 for 81 for New South Wales—and 11 wickets in the match—against Queensland in December 1905. He then moved to the United States to pursue his studies. While a student of dentistry at the University of Pennsylvania, he toured England in 1908 and Jamaica in 1908-09 with the Philadelphian cricket team. He played 17 first class matches for Philadelphians, and it was during his time in America that he perfected his googly.

Hordern returned to Australia in 1910.  Owing to the foresight of Warren Bardsley, he found his way back into the state side immediately.  After picking up 43 wickets in six matches in the 1910–11 season, he convinced the Australian selectors to follow Bardsley's lead. Chosen for the Fourth Test of the 1910–11 series against South Africa, he took fourteen wickets at an average of 21.07 in his two Tests in this series, including 5 in the second innings on debut, and 32 wickets at 24.37 against England in the following season. In the England series, he had match figures of 12 for 135 in the first Test at Sydney, assisting Australia to their only win of the series. In the final game, also at Sydney, he took 10 for 161. By this time, he was being called the best bowler of his type in the world.

Hordern's priority in life was his medical career. This, along with the controversy surrounding the selection of the team to tour England in 1912, restricted his career. He participated in only 35 first-class matches between 1905 and 1913. He died at age 55 in Darlinghurst, New South Wales.

Publications
Googlies: Coals from a Test-Cricketer's Fireplace (Angus & Robertson: Sydney, 1932).

Notes

References

Wisden obituary
The Oxford Companion to Australian Cricket, Cashman et al. (ed), Oxford University Press (1996),

Further reading
Rick Smith, Googlyman: The Story of HV 'Ranji' Hordern, Apple Books, 2005, .

Australia Test cricketers
New South Wales cricketers
Philadelphian cricketers
1883 births
1938 deaths
Australian cricketers
Cricketers who have taken five wickets on Test debut
Cricketers from Sydney
Horden family